Hollywood Theater is a historic Art Deco theater building in Leavenworth, Kansas. Designed by Robert Boller of the Boller Brothers, it is typical of theaters that were designed to be showcases in the 1920s and 1930s. It was built about 1937 or 1938 and opened on July 23, 1938. The historic building was listed on the National Register of Historic Places in 1990.

It was designed by Robert Bollers of the Kansas City, Missouri-based Boller Brothers architectural firm.

The theater closed in 1977 and was acquired by the city. Now a performing arts center, it hosts the River City Community Players.

See also
National Register of Historic Places listings in Leavenworth County, Kansas

References

Theatres in Kansas
1938 establishments in Kansas
National Register of Historic Places in Leavenworth County, Kansas
Art Deco architecture in Kansas
Buildings and structures completed in 1938
Boller Brothers buildings